Facelift is the common name for rhytidectomy, a cosmetic surgery procedure.

Facelift or Face Lift may also refer to:

 Facelift (product), the revival of a product through cosmetic means such as changing its appearance
 Facelift (automotive), minor revisions to a car model in the middle of its production run
 Facelift (album), a 1990 album by Alice in Chains
 Facelift (TV series), a New Zealand comedy show
 "Face Lift" (CSI), an episode of the television show CSI: Crime Scene Investigation
 "Facelift", a song by Soft Machine from the album Third
 "Face Lift", a song by Joni Mitchell from the album Taming the Tiger

See also
 Croydon facelift, a women's hairstyle
 Debbie Travis' Facelift, a Canadian home-improvement television program
 Window dressing